Ifalik (also spelled Ifaluk) is a coral atoll of four islands in the central Caroline Islands in the Pacific Ocean, and forms a legislative district in Yap State in the Federated States of Micronesia. The population of Ifalik was 561 in 2000, living on 1.5 km2. The primary islets of Ifalik are called Ella, Elangelap, Rawaii, and Flalap, which is the atoll's main island.

Geography

The total area is about six square kilometers.

History
Ifalik is known as a “warrior island”. Prior to European contact, its warriors invaded the outer islands in Yap as well as some of the outer islands in Chuuk. Atolls under the attack included, Lamotrek, Faraulep, Woleai, Elato, Satawal, Ulithi, and Poluwat (outer islet of Chuuk).

As with all of the Caroline Islands, sovereignty passed to the Empire of Germany in 1899. The island came under the control of the Empire of Japan after World War I, and was subsequently administered under the South Seas Mandate. Following World War II, the island came under the control of the United States of America and was administered as part of the Trust Territory of the Pacific Islands from 1947, and became part of the Federated States of Micronesia from 1979.

Notes

References
 Columbia Gazetteer of the World. Vol. 1, p. 900

External links

Islands of Yap
Municipalities of Yap
Atolls of the Federated States of Micronesia